Zodarion maculatum is a spider species found in Portugal, Spain, Sicily and Morocco.

See also 
 List of Zodariidae species

References

External links 

maculatum
Spiders of Europe
Spiders of Africa
Fauna of Morocco
Spiders described in 1870